Qatif or Al-Qatif ( Al-Qaṭīf) is a governorate and urban area located in Eastern Province, Saudi Arabia. It extends from Ras Tanura and Jubail in the north to Dammam in the south, and from the Persian Gulf in the east to King Fahd International Airport in the west. This region has its own municipality and includes the Qatif downtown, Safwa, Saihat, Tarout Island, and many other smaller cities and towns.

Qatif is one of the oldest settlements in Eastern Arabia, its history going back to 3500 BC, more than 5000 years ago, and was part of the Bahrain Region which was called Dilmun at that time and the Sumerians knew it as the land of Paradise, immortality, and life. Before the discovery of oil, Qatifi people used to work as merchants, farmers, and fishermen. However, Since the development of the oil fields in the late 1940s, Qatif has lost its status as an important port to Ad-Dammam and from the 1990s they tend to work in the oil industry, public services, education, and healthcare sectors.

Several travelers visited the city, the most two famous of them were Abulfeda (1273–1331), who described it: "Al-Qatif: a town next to Al-Ahsa, of a beautiful nature, whose people are well-groomed, and it is on the Arab side of the Persian Sea coast." And Ibn Battuta (1304–1369): "Then we traveled to the city of Al-Qatif, its name is derived from fruit picking, which is an oasis of water and a large city with many palm trees inhabited by sects of Shiite Arabs."

Its survival in the midst of desert surroundings is due not only to its being a coastal city but to the fact that Qatif is a green oasis with rich agricultural soil. Qatif itself is surrounded by a jungle of palm trees. Springs are abundant in the Oasis of Qatif. On the East, there lies the Persian Gulf. Its warm and calm waters are rich in marine life; fishes, shrimps, and pearls. Also, some springs are found in the midst of its waters. On the west lies, Al-Dahna Desert with its golden sands intermingled with little rocky heights. There are many landmarks in Qatif such as the old city of the Qala'a and Awamiya, Tarout Castle, Darin castle which was built to repel the attacks of the Portuguese campaign on Bahrain in the 15th century, and traditional markets such as the Khamis market; In addition to statues, which were transferred to the National Museum in Riyadh to be preserved.

Etymology and history

Qatif functioned for centuries as the most important trade port in Eastern Arabia, to the point where the whole Persian Gulf was labeled "Sea of Qatif". The term Qatif is derived from what translates to "harvest" or "grain", signifying the area's past agricultural history.

The historic oasis area shows its first archaeological evidence of settlement beginning about 3500 BC. It was known by other names, such as Al-Khatt, immortalized in the poetry of Antarah ibn Shaddad, Tarafa ibn Al-`Abd, Bashar ibn Burd (in his famous Ba'yya), and others. The word "Khatty" became the preferred "kenning" for "spear" in traditional poetic writing until the dawn of the modern era, supposedly because the region was famous for spear making, just as "muhannad" ("of India") was the preferred kenning for "sword". The older name also survives as the eponym of several well-known local families ("Al-Khatti", spelled variously in English).
Until the advent of Ottoman rule in the 18th century, Qatif belonged to the historical region known as the Province of Bahrain, along with Al-Hasa and the present-day Bahrain islands.

In 899 the Qarmatians conquered the region with the oases of Qatif and Al-Hasa. They declared themselves independent and reigned from al-Mu'miniya near modern Hofuf until 1071. The Buyids of western Persia raided Qatif in 988. From 1071 until 1253 the Uyunids ruled the region first from the city of "al-Hasa" (predecessor to modern Hofuf) and later from Qatif. In 1253 the Usfurids rose from Al-Hasa and ruled during the struggle of Qays with the Hormuz for control of the coast. Probably at about this time, Qatif became the main port for the mainland surpassing 'Uqair in importance for the trade and thus became the capital of the Usfurids. Ibn Battuta, visited Qatif in 1331 and found it a large and prosperous city inhabited by Arab tribes whom he described as "extremist Shi`is". Power shifted in 1440 to the Jabrids of the Al-Hasa oasis.

Portuguese 
In 1515 the Portuguese conquered Hormuz and sacked Qatif in 1520, killing the Jabrid ruler Muqrin ibn Zamil. The Portuguese invaded the island of Bahrain and stayed there for the next eighty years. The ruler of Basra extended his power to Qatif in 1524 but ultimately in 1549 the Ottomans took over, though they could not expel the Portuguese from the island of Bahrain. In 1551 The Portuguese conquered  Qatif maintaining  domain of the gulf allied with the Pasha of Basra.

In 1680 the Al Humayd of the Banu Khalid took the by now weak garrison of the Ottomans in Hofuf. In a battle at Ghuraymil, south of Qatif, the Banu Khalid lost their rule to the new "First Saudi State" in 1790. In 1818 the Saudi State was destroyed in the Ottoman-Saudi War and the commander of the mostly Egyptian troops, Ibrahim Pasha, took control of Hofuf, only to evacuate it the next year and return to the west coast. The Humayd regained control until the Banu Khalid were finally defeated in 1830 by the "Second Saudi State" who now took control of the whole region. The Ottomans moved in again in 1871 not to be expelled until 1913 when Ibn Saud finally established the Saudi rule in the Eastern Province.

Modern political history

1929 riots
The economy of Qatif witnessed a sharp decline in the 1920s, initially due to the invention of cultured pearls which severely impacted the Gulf pearl trade, then due to World War I. The decline was accelerated by a special "Jihad" tax imposed by the Saudis (then the Sultanate of Nejd), which was used to fund military campaigns. The economic situation became so dire that many citizens were imprisoned for unpaid taxes, including several wealthy landowners and merchants. Then in 1929, the tax was doubled. Riots broke out in several towns, and a large group escaped to Bahrain and requested protection from the British consul. The governor of Qatif responded with intimidation and mass imprisonments. Several notables wrote letters to King Abdulaziz voicing their complaints. He eventually met with the governor and some citizens, pardoned past-due taxes, and reduced new taxes.

1979 protests

The Shias have participated in all the strikes and other political demonstrations that have taken place in the kingdom. The most significant were the 1979 strikes when the Saudi armed forces were called in. The Shias in Saudi Arabia were very receptive to Khomeini and demonstrated against the Saudi royal family on the hitherto novel grounds that Islam and hereditary kingship are not compatible. When American jets landed in Dhahran Air Base for manoeuvres, citizens of Qatif organized a big demonstration. The demonstrators spent the evening of 11 November 1979 shouting slogans against the royal family and the Americans. The Saudi government responded by imposing a curfew on all the towns in the Qatif area, sealing off the area with tanks and armoured vehicles. A bloody showdown between the armed forces and the Shiites continued until 30 November 1979, in which thousands were arrested, hundreds injured and 24 killed.

2011 protests 

On 10 March 2011, in the wake of the Arab Spring and a day before called-for "day of rage" protests across Saudi Arabia, 'dozens' of Shias attended a rally in the city centre calling for political reforms in the kingdom and the release of prisoners allegedly held without charge for more than 16 years. The government declared protests to be illegal and it had previously warned against this action. Police opened fire on the protestors, injuring three, and there were reports of stun grenades being used as well as many more injuries from police use of batons. Further protests in Qatif continued throughout 2011.
Over six people were reported to be killed by the government's forces since November 2011. However, the government tried to overshadow the reports but social networking groups has highly worked to demonstrate the way the government used force against the protesters

2012 and 2017–2019 protests 

Activists in Qatif first took to the streets in March 2011, demanding the release of political prisoners. In early January 2012, Riyadh ordered the arrest of 23 people responsible for unrest in the Eastern Province.

Activists reported that seven protesters were killed from November 2011 to 10 February 2012 in Qatif.

The march on 10 February 2012 was reportedly organised to protest against the killings of demonstrators, who were calling  for reforms, an end to sectarian discrimination and the release of political prisoners. "While security men were following up on an illegal gathering in the town of al Awamiya in Qatif on Friday they were attacked by gunfire," said a police statement published by the state news agency, Saudi Press Agency (SPA). Zuhair al Said was killed on 10 February 2012 when police opened fire to disperse protesters in the town of al Awamiya, in the Qatif region. About 500 people were arrested since March 2011. Activists said 80 remained in custody, including author Nazir al Majid and human rights activist Fadil al Munasif. In July 2012, the government arrested Nimr al-Nimr, a Shiite preacher who called for protests against the government. The arrest of such an icon in the city of Qatif resulted in protests the evening of his arrest. Government snipers killed two protesters that night: Sayed Akbar al-Shakori and Sayed Mohammed Alfelfel. Videos of the killing were released on video streaming sites such as YouTube.com.

Cuisine
Although Qatif has a traditional Arab cuisine, in which it shares dishes with its surroundings, it is famous and specializes in several dishes, including:

Climate
Qatif has a desert climate with temperatures approaching  in the summer and an average humidity of 75%. During the months of May and June, warm seasonal winds called albwarh affect the region. The rest of the year, the moist southern winds, or alcos, bring humidity. There is little rainfall.

Demographics
The Qatif region is the largest concentration of Shia Islam in Saudi Arabia; less than 10% of Qatif are Sunni Muslims. Qatif is the centre of the Shiite population in Saudi Arabia. Since 2005, the government has eased the restrictions on commemorating Day of Ashura in public.

As of 2009, the total population of Qatif was 474,573. Qatif has one of the lowest numbers of non-Saudi residents in the kingdom (only 59,808).

Culture 

Several periodic religious occasions are held in Qatif, the most prominent of which are the Eid al-Fitr and Eid al-Adha, as well as Qarqi'an, and the deaths and births of Muhammad and the twelve Imams.

At the beginning of each Hijri year, Qatif is draped with black, red and green banners and flags over houses, alleys and roads, which is intended to announce the state of mourning and the start of the Ashura season from the beginning of the month of Muharram until the end of the month of Safar in commemoration of the days of Ashura in which Hussein bin Ali, grandson of Muhammad was killed in the Battle of Karbala. These days have a special importance for the majority of the Qatif community, in which shops are closed and no marriage takes place, and any sign of joy is abolished, and black or dark colors are worn. These days are accompanied by Hussaini Majlises which are religious or scientific lectures delivered by clerics in Husseiniyas or mosques. And the practice of Husseini rites. During the 10 days, Small kiosks are erected by volunteers in the squares and streets to provide free food, sweets and beverages to the audience and passers-by. Mahmous, a local black colored dish is widely offered during Ashura to indicate a climate of grief.

Traditionally, people go out to the seashore to celebrate after the end of Safar, and when they return in the sunset, heaps of straw are collected and burned to symbolize the burning of mourning monuments. Pottery, worn-out trays, and pots are disposed of by smashing them, a habit that seemed to fade away, but few still do it nonetheless.

Joy and festivals pervade all of Qatif on during Qarqi'an, on the 15th of the month of Sha’ban, which coincides with the birth of Al-Mahdi, and this day is called Al-Nasifah, and on the 15th of Ramadan, which coincides with the birth of Hassan bin Ali, and is called Karikshon. Qarqi'an is an annual custom found in both Bahrain, Qatif and some other areas in the Persian Gulf, where celebrations are held, feasts are made, new clothes are worn, candles are lit, and people and children between 4 and 12 years go out to the streets of old villages and neighborhoods to celebrate. Mosques prepare early to receive visitors, and people distribute sweets and food. The girls wear traditional clothes and are decorated with henna. The children chant folk songs, while they roam the neighborhoods with large bags to collect candy distributed from houses.

Economy

Qatifi people are likely to work in the oil industry (Saudi Aramco, Schlumberger, Halliburton and Baker Hughes). Some of the employees have moved to Dhahran, where these companies are located, but the majority still reside in Qatif and go to Dhahran by cars or Saudi Aramco buses in about 50 minutes' journey. Others work in Aramco refineries in Ras Tanura. and others work in the petrochemical companies in Jubail (80 km from Qatif), some go everyday and some have moved to Jubail. SABIC is the largest employer in Qatif, However, some Qatifi are also working in other oil, petrochemical, and engineering companies located in Dhahran, Khobar, Dammam, Ras Tanura, or Jubail. Some of Qatifi people work in public services, health care and education.

The Qatif coastline is rich with shrimp and many varieties of fish. Qatif Fish Market is the largest in the Middle East. Qatif villages are known to have many date palms and other fruits.

On 8 March 2020 Qatif was put into lockdown by Saudi Arabia until 29 April 2020 because of cases of COVID-19.

Education
There are several educational facilities built by the government and Saudi Aramco for all age levels, starting from first grade in elementary school to secondary school. Most of the schools are public (government owned) but there are some private schools as well.

Tourism

 Qatif is known for its traditional markets (suqs) such as the weekly Thursday Market "Suq Alkhamees" and "Suq Waqif"
 Esplanade along its shore
 Tarout castle in Tarout Island 
 Qal'at al-Qatif; ancient castle ruins
 Abu Loza's Bath, old Turkish bath
 It is also known for its massive agricultural areas that are rich in various types of vegetation and palm trees.
 Qatif is also known for its old historical heritage which was influenced by the different civilizations that lived here over the centuries. This  is reflected in the architecture of its old buildings that lie in the areas in the old villages of Qatif (Al-Awamiyah, Al-Qudaih, Al Qala'a etc.).
 Different festivals throughout the year including Aldoukhala, Eid festivals, etc.

Transport

Airport

Highway
Qatif is connected with other Saudi urban centers through highways mainly the Dhahran-Jubail Highway which runs across Qatif, and Abu Hadriyah Highway which serves as a western border for Qatif and separates it from King Fahd International Airport. The Gulf Road links the city with Dammam.

It is also close to the causeway that connects the kingdom with the nation of Bahrain (about ).

Towns and villages
List of some towns and villages forming Qatif county:

 Al-Awamiyah
 Al-Awjam
 Al-Jaroudiya
 Al-Jish
 Al-Khuwailidiya
 Al-Kuwaikeb
 Al-Malahha
 Al-Qatif city
 Al-Qudaih
 Al-Rabeeya
 Al-Rabi'ia
 Al-Taubi
 Aljish
 Enak
 Hellat-Muhaish
 Al-Qala'a
 Safwa city
 Saihat city
 Sanabes
 Tarout Island
 Umm Al-Hamam
 Umm-Sahik

See also 

 List of cities and towns in Saudi Arabia

References

External links
 Qatif online
 Geography of Qatif
 Qatif Oasis 
 Qatif travel guide at World66
 Qatif photos
 Pictures of Old Qatif

 
Former Portuguese colonies
Port cities and towns of the Persian Gulf
Populated places in Eastern Province, Saudi Arabia
Port cities and towns in Saudi Arabia
Oases of Saudi Arabia